Cathy Lee "Catt" Gravitt is an American songwriter based in Nashville, Tennessee. In the music business for over 20 years, she signed on as a writer with her current publishing company, Razor and Tie, in 2008. Gravitt has songwriting credits in multiple genres and has written songs with or for several artists including Kid Rock, Kelly Clarkson, Kelsea Ballerini, Jake Owen, Vince Gill and Natalie Grant, among others. In 2012, she won the SESAC Songwriter of the Year award. Gravitt most recently won the Canadian Country Music Association's 2018 Songwriter(s) of the Year award, along with co-writers Skip Black and Aaron Goodvin, for the song "Lonely Drum", performed by Aaron Goodvin.

Career 
After graduating from Eastern Illinois University with a journalism degree, Gravitt initially set out to be an artist. She was signed to A&M Records in an all-girl pop group in Los Angeles. After the group parted ways she made her way to Nashville where she sparked the attention of producer Garth Fundis (Trisha Yearwood, Don Williams, Sugarland). After being signed to a label development deal, Gravitt began focusing more specifically on her writing career.

A song Gravitt co-wrote about a fire that injured her godson was initially put on hold for an artist in country music, and ended up in the hands of Christian music/gospel artist Natalie Grant. The song, “In Better Hands” became a CCM No.1 single (Gravitt’s first no.1) for Grant, and was nominated for Gospel Music Associations (GMA) Song of the Year and Pop Song of the Year in 2008.

Gravitt has had three different publishing deals, but has been with publishing company Razor and Tie since 2008.

In recent years, Gravitt has had simultaneous radio singles ("Amen", Eden's Edge; "Alone With You", Jake Owen; "Why Ya Wanna", Jana Kramer) on the charts in country music; garnered a producer credit (as well as helping to pen 8 of the 11 tracks on the debut album) for rock band Sons of Sylvia, along with well-respected producer Jack Joseph Puig (John Mayer, U2, Stone Temple Pilots); and a vocal producer gig from Warner Bros.

Gravitt has multiple writing credits for major pop artists like Adam Lambert and Kelly Clarkson, and the Irish group Boyzone.

Recognitions and awards
Gravitt was a part of the 2004, 5x multi-platinum Rascal Flatts album Feels Like Today with her song "Where You Are" (co-written with songwriter James LeBlanc). The album reached No. 1 on both the U.S. Billboard 200 and U.S. Billboard Top Country Albums charts, and was nominated by the Academy of Country Music (ACM) for Album of the Year.

"In Better Hands" (Natalie Grant Relentless, 2008 Curb Records) became Gravitt's first No. 1 song on the Hot Christian AC chart. It received GMA Dove Award nominations for both Song of the Year and Pop/Contemporary Song of the Year in 2008. The album itself reached No. 2 on Billboard's Top Christian Albums of 2008.

Released in October 2011, Gravitt's song "Alone With You", recorded by Jake Owen, was a multi-week No. 1 on the Billboard Hot Country Songs chart, and was certified GOLD by the RIAA. His album Barefoot Blue Jean Night also reached No. 6 on the US Billboard 200, and No. 1 on U.S. Billboard Top Country Albums.

Kelly Clarkson recorded Gravitt's song "Honestly" on her 2011 platinum album Stronger which reached No. 2 on the U.S Billboard Top 200 Albums. The album also won a Grammy for Best Pop Vocal Album in 2012. (Clarkson is No. 2 on Billboard's Year End Charts for AC Artists in 2012.)

Another one of Gravitt's songs "Why Ya Wanna" was recorded by Jana Kramer and released in 2012, breaking a record previously set by recording artist Taylor Swift when it reached No. 3 on the mediabase chart; the highest debut for any new artist since Swift's song "Tim Mcgraw" which reached No. 5 on the mediabase chart with its debut in 2006. The song, which was certified GOLD in the US by the RIAA, also reached No. 3 on the U.S Billboard Country and U.S. Billboard Country Airplay charts. "Why Ya Wanna" landed at No. 3 on the Billboard Year End Charts for Hot Country Songs for 2012. (Kramer also went on to receive the No. 4 spot on Billboard's Year End Charts for both Top New Country Artists, and Top Country Female Artists.)

Also released in 2012, Gravitt's songs "Underneath" and "Runnin'" were a part of Adam Lambert's album Trespassing which became No. 1 on the U.S. Billboard 200, Canadian Albums Chart, and Hungarian Albums Chart.

Gravitt was nominated for Music Row's Breakthrough Songwriter of the Year in 2012, and won the SESAC Songwriter of the Year award for 2012, an award that was held by singer/songwriter from the country group Lady Antebellum, Hillary Scott, for the previous 2 years.

Most recently, Gravitt won the Canadian Country Music Association's 2018 Songwriter(s) of the Year, along with co-writers Skip Black and Aaron Goodvin, for the song "Lonely Drum", performed by Aaron Goodvin.

Discography

Singles

Songs written by Gravitt
{| class="wikitable" style="text-align:center;"
|-
! Year !! Song !! Artist !! Album !!Co-writers 
|-
| 1997 || "Don't Break the Wings" || Holly Dunn || Leave One Bridge Standing || 
|-
| 2001 || "I'm Goin' Back"|| Trace Adkins || Chrome || Craig Wiseman, Bobby Terry 
|-
| rowspan="3"| 2003 || Where You Are" || James Leblanc || Muscle Shoals City Limits || 
|-
| "You Have No Idea" || Kenny Rogers || Back to the Well ||  
|-
| "If I Was An Angel" || Daniel Lee Martin || All That I Am ||  
|-
| rowspan="2"| 2004 || "Where You Are" || Rascal Flatts || Feels Like Today || James LeBlanc 
|-
| "If I Was An Angel" || Glenn Cummings || Big ||  
|-
| rowspan="2"| 2005 || "In My Neighborhood" || Craig Morgan || My Kind of Livin''' || Monty Padson, Danny Wells
|-
| "This is Me Missing You" || Joey Daniels || Take Me Off the Market|| 
|-
| rowspan="4"| 2006 || "My Life" || Ronnie Milsap || My Life || Gerald O'Brien, Pam Rose
|-
| "High" || Trace Adkins || Dangerous Man || 
|-
| "My Life" || Doc Walker || Doc Walker ||  Gerald O'Brien, Pam Rose
|-
| "Love Me Wild" || Angela Hacker || Nashville Star Season 5 || 
|-
| rowspan="2"| 2008 ||"In Better Hands" || Natalie Grant || Relentless || Jim Daddario
|-
| "Help Me, Help You" || Julianne Hough || Julianne Hough || Danny Green
|-
| rowspan="5" |2009 || "Anything is Possible" || Jake Mcvey || Anything is Possible || 
|-
| "Train" || Davisson Brothers Band || Davisson Brothers Band ||
|-
| "Lies" || Martina McBride || Shine || Tania Hancheraff, Gerlad O'Brien, David Campbell
|-
| "You Wouldn't Cry (Andrew's Song) || Mandisa || Freedom || Mandisa, Cindy Morgan
|-
| En Tus Manos (In Better Hands) || Shelia Romero || En Tus Manos || 
|-
| rowspan="11" |2010 || "Plastic Jesus" || High Valley || High Valley ||James LeBlance 
|-
| "High" || David Bradley || Movin' On || 
|-
| "Nothing Without You" || Boyzone || Brother || Tom Shapiro, busbee
|-
| "50 Ways" || rowspan="8"| Sons of Sylvia || rowspan="8"| Revelation || Ashley Clark, Gerald O'Brien
|-
| "The War Within" || Ashley Clark, Adam Clark, Austin Clark, Brian Howes
|-
| "Song of Solomon" ||Ashley Clark, Gerald O'Brien
|-
| "Long Beach" || Ashley Clark, Adam Clark, Austin Clark
|-
| "John Wayne" || Ashley Clark, Gerald O'Brien
|-
| "I'll Know You" || Ashley Clark, Adam Clark, Austin Clark, Brian Howes
|-
| "Give Me Love" || Ashley Clark, Mile Shimshack
|-
| "Ghost Town" || Ashley Clark, Mike Shimshack
|-
| rowspan="8"| 2011 || "I Hope You're Listening to the Radio" || Nicole Donatone || If You Knew ||
|-
| "Hurry Down Sunshine" || Mycle Wastman || I'm All Over It ||
|-
| "Sunshine" || George Canyon || Better Be Home Soon || 
|-
| "Tell Me a Lie" || The Downtown Fiction || Let's Be Animals || 
|-
| "Every Other Memory" || Eli Young Band || Life at Best || Chris DeStefano, Josh Kear
|-
| "Nothing Without You" || Committed || Committed || 
|-
| "Alone With You" || Jake Owen || Barefoot Blue Jean Night || Shane McAnally, J. T. Harding
|-
| "Honestly" || Kelly Clarkson || Stronger || Tom Shapiro, Robert Marvin
|-
| rowspan="10"| 2012 || "I Hope You're Listening to the Radio" || Lucie Evans || I Hope You're Listening to the Radio || 
|-
| "What a Song Can Do" || Rachel Crow || Rachel Crow || Gerald O'Brien, Jackie Wilson
|-
| "Underneath" || rowspan="2"| Adam Lambert || rowspan="2"| Trespassing || Adam Lambert, Tom Shapiro, Josh Crosby
|-
| "Runnin' " || Adam Lambert, David Marshall, Fred Williams, Robert Marvin
|-
| "Goodbye California" || rowspan="3"| Jana Kramer ||rowspan="3"| Jana Kramer || Jana Kramer, Josh Crosby, Leslie Roy
|-
| "Whiskey"  || Sam Mizer
|-
| "Why Ya Wanna" || Ashley Gorley, Chris DeStefano
|-
| "Last Supper" || rowspan="3"| Edens Edge || rowspan="3"| Edens Edge || Hannah Blaylock
|-
| "Amen"|| Skip Black, Hannah Blaylock, Gerald O'Brien
|-
| "Roots"  || Cherrill Green, Skip Black
|-
| rowspan="3"| 2014 || "Just Another Song" || Lucy Hale || Road Between || Mike Daly, Lucy Hale
|-
| "Fight" || Gloriana || Three || 
|-
| "Baseball Cap" || John King || On Your Lips EP || 
|-
| rowspan="7"| 2015 || To the Moon || Ashley Clark || Greyhound EP ||
|-
| "Day Before Temptation" || The SteelDrivers || The Muscle Shoals Recordings ||
|-
| "XO" || Kelsea Ballerini || The First Time || Kelsea Ballerini, Gerald O'Brien
|-
| "Bullet" || rowspan="4"|Jana Kramer || rowspan="4"| Thirty One || Jana Kramer, Martin Frederiksen
|-
| "Don't Touch My Radio" || Jana Kramer, Blair Daly
|-
| "Just Like in the Movies" || Jana Kramer, Brian Keirulf
|-
| "Love" || Jimmy Robbins
|-
| rowspan="2"| 2016 || "Lonely Drum" || Aaron Goodvin || || Aaron Goodvin, Skip Black 
|-
| "I Can't Do This" || Vince Gill || Down to My Last Habit || Vince Gill, Brennin Hunt
|-
| rowspan="2"| 2017 || "Tennessee Mountaintop" || rowspan="2"| Kid Rock || rowspan="2"| Sweet Southern Sugar || Kid Rock, Tim Montana
|-
| "Greatest Show on Earth" || Kid Rock, Tim Montana
|-
| rowspan="2"| 2018 || "OK" || Ilse DeLange || Ilse DeLange || Ilse DeLange, Tofer Brown 
|-
| "Millionaires" || Thompson Square || || Marv Green, Courtney Cole 
|-
| rowspan="2"| 2019 || "Impossible" || Carlos Vara || Carlos Vara || Carlos Vara, Josh Bruce Williams 
|-
| "The Only Thing I Ever Got Right" || Ilse DeLange || Gravel and Dust || Ilse DeLange, Tofer Brown
|-
| 2021 || "Don't Quit" || Jordan Smith || Be Still & Know || Jordan Smith, Bernie Herms
|}

Other credits

Vocal production

TV/PlacementsOne Tree Hill, Desperate Housewives, Nashville, Dancing With the Stars, American Idol, Jimmy Kimmel Live, The Jay Leno Show, CMT Music Awards, ACA Awards, The Next: Fame is at Your Doorstep, Opry Live, The Singing Bee, Home for the Holidays 2012 CBS Special, The Fosters, Vanderpump Rules'', etc

References

External links 
 Catt Gravitt – Razor and Tie Bio
 Catt Gravitt – Credits
 SESAC Article: "Catt Gravitt: Sweet Sound of Success"

American country songwriters
Living people
Razor & Tie artists
Songwriters from Illinois
Year of birth missing (living people)
Canadian Country Music Association Songwriter(s) of the Year winners